Abhalmaya was an Indian Marathi television series which was aired on Alpha TV Marathi. It is one of the successful Marathi television series. It starred Sukanya Kulkarni, Manoj Joshi and Sanjay Mone in lead roles.

Seasons

Plot 
The story revolves around the Professor Sudha Joshi teacher in Ratanbai College, whose family includes her husband Sharad who is also a professor, and they have two daughters Akansha and Anushka. When Sharad falls in love with another Professor Chitra whom he have a one daughter named Chingi, it leads to a rift in the family.

Cast

Main
 Sukanya Kulkarni as Sudha Joshi; professor from Ratanbai college, Sharad's wife, Akansha & Anushka's mother, Chingi's stepmother
 Manoj Joshi as Sharad Joshi; Sudha & Chitra's husband, Akansha, Anushka & Chingi's father
 Sanjay Mone as Jaya Nimkar; Sudha's colleague
 Atisha Naik as Chitra; Sharad's girlfriend, Chingi's mother
 Shweta Sane as Varsha Nimkar
 Mukta Barve replacing sane as Varsha Nimkar
 Shubhangi Joshi as Akka
 Mugdha Godbole as Akansha Joshi; Sudha and Sudhir's daughter
 Sanjyot Hardikar-Pawar replacing godbole as Akansha Joshi
 Pari Telang as Anushka Joshi; Sudha and Sudhir's daughter
 Manava Naik replacing gokhale as elder Anushka Joshi
 Sameera Kumari replacing naik as elder Anushka Joshi
 Swarangi Marathe as young (Chingi) Akshata Joshi; Sudhir and Chitra's daughter
 Ketaki Thatte replacing marathe as elder (Chingi) Akshata Joshi
 Chaitrali Chirmule-Gupte as elder (Chingi) Akshata Joshi
 Harshada Khanvilkar as Sushma; Sukanya's sister
 Ankush Chaudhari as Sunny; Sushma's husband

Recurring
 Bhushan Dhupkar as Bunty
 Umesh Kamat as Bunty
 Shaila Sawant-Kanekar as Prof. Sunanda Sonawane
 Swati Apte as Prof. Ranganekar
 Vijay Patwardhan as Prof. Ghatpande
 Ajit Kelkar as Prof. Gawaskar
 Uday Sabnis as Manna Pradhan
 Pratibha Goregaonkar as Seema
 Prashant Deshpande as Kiran
 Rahul Mehendale as Kiran
 Purnima Patil as Pallavi
 Rujuta Deshmukh as Pallavi
 Amod Oak as Bhushan
 Rutuj Kulkarni as Bhushan
 Sunita Gore as Aaji
 Prasad Pandit as Arvind Mahajan
 Smita Oak as Sarita Mahajan
 Parag Bedekar as Nishant
 Shreyas Talpade as Nishant Mahajan
 Meena Naik as Kalyani Shirodkar
 Avishkar as Virendra Shirodkar
 Kshama Ninawe as Nutan Shirodkar
 Irawati Lagoo as Priti Shirodkar
 Ashok Sathe as Mr. Kulkarni
 Prasad Oak as Suhas Dani
 Jayant Ghate as Vishwanath
 Vilas Ujawane as Bhai Shelar
 Hridaynath Rane as Aaba 
 Vivek Gore as Inspector Jayesh Chorghade
 Ramdas Jadhav as Inspector Mane
 Ravindra Berde as Mr. Thorat
 Kshitij Zarapkar as Mr. Chandekar
 Asawari Paranjape as Mrunal Dhurandhar
 Shivaji Raut as Abhay Dhurandhar
 Ganesh Pai as Manoj Kapadiya
 Sonali Khare as Reshma Kapadiya
 Neha Bam as Meera Yerawar
 Arun Mohare as Khanderao Yerawar
 Sachin Khedekar as Shrirang Yerawar
 Suhas Naware as Karbhari
 Vinay Apte as Yashwant Pawar (Kaka)
 Arun Nalawade as Anna
 Atharva Gharpure as Tanvir
 Vedvati as Mohini
 Swanandi Tikekar as Varsha
 Sunil Tawade as Nachiket
 Milind Phatak as Kaushik
 Jagdish as C.P. Wagale
 Anil Bhandare as Pratap More 
 Ajit Bhagat as Manohar Warang
 Jagannath Kandalgaonkar as Mr. Kharshikar
 Raju Patwardhan as Shipai
 Prabhakar Pawar as Ramesh
 Mahesh Subhedar as Eknath
 Ashok Sawant as Mr. Deshpande
 Subodh Bhave as Inspector Mohan
 Shweta Mehendale as Reva
 Bharati Patil as Inspector

References

External links 
 
 Abhalmaya at ZEE5

1999 Indian television series debuts
2003 Indian television series endings
Marathi-language television shows
Zee Marathi original programming